The Azerbaijan national handball team is the national handball team of Azerbaijan, representing the country in international matches. It is controlled by the Azerbaijan Handball Federation.

IHF Emerging Nations Championship record
2017 – 10th place
2019 – 10th place
2023 – Qualified

Islamic Solidarity Games
Handball at the 2017 Islamic Solidarity Games– 5th place
Handball at the 2021 Islamic Solidarity Games– 6th place

External links
Official website
IHF profile

Men's national handball teams
National sports teams of Azerbaijan